The 2014 New York City Marathon was the 44th running of the annual marathon race in New York City, United States, which took place on November 2. The elite men's race was won by Wilson Kipsang Kiprotich of Kenya with a time of 2:10:59 and the women's race by Mary Jepkosgei Keitany, also of Kenya, with a time of 2:25:07.

It was the largest marathon ever, with a record number of 50,869 starters. With 50,564 finishers (30,035 men and 20,398 women), having an average finish time of 4:34:45, the race also broke the record for most finishers.

The winds were exceptional this year, forcing race officials to move the start line of the wheelchair and handcycle competitions to the Brooklyn side of the Verrazano-Narrows Bridge, shortening the course to 23.2 miles. Kurt Fearnley of Australia won the men's wheelchair division with a time of 1:30:55, earning his fifth New York City win. American Tatyana McFadden successfully defended her title with a time of 1:42:16 on the shortened course, and, as a result, has become not only the sole person to have ever won four major marathons in a year (Boston, London, Chicago, and New York City), but also the sole person to do so two years in a row.

This was the first marathon for which Tata Consultancy Services was the title sponsor. In addition, the one-millionth finisher of the New York City Marathon (since the marathon was first held in 1970), Katherine Slingluff of Brooklyn, completed her race with a time of 4:43:36.

Results

Men

Women

† Ran in mass race
 Rkia El Moukim of Morocco originally finished in sixth place in a time of 2:28:12 hours. Her performance was subsequently annulled due to doping as a result of abnormalities in her biological passport.

Wheelchair men

Wheelchair women

Handcycle men

Handcycle women

References 

Results
TCS New York City Marathon 2014. New York Road Runners. Retrieved 2020-05-09.
Men's results. Association of Road Racing Statisticians. Retrieved 2020-04-11.
Women's results. Association of Road Racing Statisticians. Retrieved 2020-04-11.

External links

New York Road Runners website

2014
New York City
Marathon
New York City Marathon